Stearns Iron-Front Building, also known as the Stearns Block, is a historic commercial building located in Richmond, Virginia. It was built in 1869, and is a four-story, 14 bay, brick building with a cast iron front.

Richmond Unionist Franklin Stearns acquired what had once been the Planters Bank Building on Main Street after the American Civil War. In 1868 he erected rental housing and commercial office space, which was nicknamed the "Stearns block." The city's circuit court was held there beginning in 1870. His grandchildren's estate sold the property in 1923; the remaining iron front was noted in the Historic American Buildings Survey.

It was listed on the National Register of Historic Places in 1970.

References

External links
Stearns Iron Front Building, 1007-1013 East Main Street, Richmond, Independent City, VA: 2 photos and 15 data pages at Historic American Buildings Survey

Historic American Buildings Survey in Virginia
Commercial buildings on the National Register of Historic Places in Virginia
Cast-iron architecture in Virginia
Commercial buildings completed in 1869
Buildings and structures in Richmond, Virginia
National Register of Historic Places in Richmond, Virginia
1869 establishments in Virginia